An In memoriam card is a Christian devotional image that is printed on its back as a commemoration for certain events such as the receiving the sacrament of the first holy communion, the making of solemn vows, the bestowal of holy orders or the consecration of virgins, and their major anniversaries. It often also includes a prayer, a quotation from the Bible and dates regarding the given event. Special forms of the in memoriam cards are Osterbilder and Sterbebildchen as well as in memoriam cards collected and blessed at a place of pilgrimage.

History 

New Year wishes are among the oldest motifs of small devotional pictures and appear as monastic friendship gifts as early as the Middle Ages. So-called Osterbildchen or Osterbilder ("Easter pictures") occurred for the first time at the end of the 17th century and derive from the Baroque period. They were handed every year to the communicants in the Easter vigil and during Eastertide. This custom is still common.

In German-speaking Catholic regions in memoriam cards are also manufactured on the occasion of the announcement of a death in the family (called Totenbildchen, Totenzettel in Austria also Parte), combined with the request for prayers. Usually they are handed or sent to people who attended the Requiem Mass and the sepulture or have offered their sympathies to the family. Wealthy families commissioned such pictures already before 1900. Ordinary citizens could not afford such expenses until the 1930s. In the course of the 1940s, only a few citizens refrained from having in memoriam cards printed and only when they did not have the financial means to do so.

Gallery

See also
Holy card

References

Catholic spirituality
Paper products
Acknowledgements of death